Mexican Teenagers is an EP by American Guitarist Kaki King released in 2009.

Track listing

Personnel 

 Kaki King: guitar
 Matt Hankle: drums
 Dan Brantigan: Electronic EVI Synth

Kaki King albums
2009 EPs
Cooking Vinyl EPs